Paul Logtens (born 7 November 1979) is a former Dutch tennis player.

Logtens has a career high ATP singles ranking of 269 achieved on 4 July 2005. He also has a career high ATP doubles ranking of 254 achieved on 23 May 2005.

Logtens made his ATP main draw debut at the 2003 Ordina Open after qualifying for the singles main draw.

External links

1979 births
Living people
Dutch male tennis players
People from Boxmeer
Sportspeople from North Brabant
20th-century Dutch people
21st-century Dutch people